William Vallance Betts LRIBA (1862 – 10 July 1933) was an English architect based in Nottingham.

Career

He was born in 1862, the son of William Betts (1835–1909) and Mary Vallance (b. 1829).

He was articled to Herbert Walker in Nottingham and later became his assistant. From 1887 to 1888, he was assistant to George Haslam in Ilkeston.

Betts commenced independent practice in Nottingham in 1888 and later went into partnership with his son, Albert William Betts.

He married Hannah Hoole (1866–1931) in 1888 in Basford, and they had the following children:
Annie Vallance Betts (1890–1981)
Albert William Betts (1892–1963)
Frank Cecil Betts (1895–1963)
Ernest Pollard Betts (1896–1972)
Jennie Betts (b. 1900)
Herbert Betts (1903–1989)

Betts died on 10 July 1933 and was buried at Basford Cemetery. He left an estate valued at £11,264.

Notable works

References

1862 births
1933 deaths
Architects from Nottingham
19th-century English architects
20th-century English architects